Detective K is a South Korean film series starring Kim Myung-min as the title character along with Oh Dal-su an important supporting character. It consists of three films.

Films

Secret of the Virtuous Widow (2011)

Secret of the Lost Island (2015)

Secret of the Living Dead (2018)

References

South Korean film series
Comedy film series